P12 or P–12 may refer to:

Aircraft 
 Boeing P-12, an interwar biplane operated by the United States Navy and Army
 Lippisch P.12, a German aircraft design study

Transportation
 Chery P12, a proposed Chinese pickup truck
 Eastover–Addison Road Line, a bus route in Washington, D.C.
 London Buses route P12
 Nissan Primera (P12), a family car
 P12 road (Zimbabwe)

Weapons 
 P-12 (missile), a Chinese ballistic missile
 Grendel P12, a .380 pistol
 FN P-12, a shotgun
 Heckler & Koch P12, a pistol

Other uses 
 P–12 (education), a designation for the sum of primary and secondary education in Australia
 P-12 radar, a Soviet 2D VHF radar system
 Papyrus 12, a biblical manuscript
 PKCS #12, a cryptographic standard